The 2017 Calgary Stampeders season was the 60th season for the team in the Canadian Football League and their 83rd overall. This season is also Dave Dickenson's second season as head coach and John Hufnagel's tenth season as general manager.

On September 24, with a 15–9 win over the Saskatchewan Roughriders, the Stampeders qualified for the playoffs for the 13th straight year and a chance to go for an 8th Grey Cup championship. Despite a loss to the Roughriders on October 20, the Stampeders clinched a first place finish in the west division, their fourth in five years, on October 21 following a Winnipeg Blue Bombers' loss. The Stampeders set a CFL record for most consecutive victories over a division opponent with 16 straight wins, dating back to the start of the 2016 CFL season. They also tied for the third-best home-winning streak in CFL history with 17 consecutive wins. Finally, they also tied for the third-best single-season winning streak in CFL history with 11 consecutive wins. All of these marks ended with their loss on October 20. They also lost consecutive games for the first time since the 2012 CFL season, with losses to the Saskatchewan Roughriders on October 20 and to the Edmonton Eskimos on October 28, ending a streak of 103 games without back-to-back losses. Their loss to the Winnipeg Blue Bombers to close out the regular season marked the first time since the 2007 CFL season that the Calgary Stampeders lost 3 games in a row, a streak that ended at 180 games. Their loss to the Blue Bombers also marked the first game in 52 contests where the team did not lead at any point during a game. The Stampeders made it all the way to the 105th Grey Cup, but they lost 24–27 to the Toronto Argonauts .

Offseason

CFL Draft
The 2017 CFL Draft took place on May 7, 2017. The Stampeders moved from eighth overall to sixth overall in a trade with Winnipeg that involved giving up a fourth-round pick.

Preseason

Regular season

Standings

Schedule

Post season

Schedule

References

Calgary Stampeders seasons
2017 Canadian Football League season by team
2017 in Alberta